is a railway station operated by the Keisei Electric Railway located in Chūō-ku, Chiba Japan. It is 2.5 kilometers from the terminus of the Keisei Chihara Line at Chiba-Chūō Station.

Lines
Keisei Electric Railway
 Keisei Chihara Line

Layout
Chibadera Station has two elevated side platforms. However, only one platform is in use serving bidirectional traffic.

Platform

History
Chibadera Station was opened on 1 April 1992.

Station numbering was introduced to all Keisei Line stations on 17 July 2010; Chibadera Station was assigned station number KS61.

Surrounding area
 Senyō-ji temple
 Aobanomori Park

External links
 Chibadera Station layout

References

Railway stations in Japan opened in 1992
Railway stations in Chiba Prefecture